Dennis Novak was the defending champion but lost in the semifinals to Arthur Cazaux.

Cazaux won the title after defeating Lloyd Harris 7–6(7–5), 6–2 in the final.

Seeds

Draw

Finals

Top half

Bottom half

References

External links
Main draw
Qualifying draw

Nonthaburi Challenger II - 1